In mathematics, a topological space is called separable if it contains a countable, dense subset; that is, there exists a sequence  of elements of the space such that every nonempty open subset of the space contains at least one element of the sequence.

Like the other axioms of countability, separability is a "limitation on size", not necessarily in terms of cardinality (though, in the presence of the Hausdorff axiom, this does turn out to be the case; see below) but in a more subtle topological sense.  In particular, every continuous function on a separable space whose image is a subset of a Hausdorff space is determined by its values on the countable dense subset.

Contrast separability with the related notion of second countability, which is in general stronger but equivalent on the class of metrizable spaces.

First examples
Any topological space that is itself finite or countably infinite is separable, for the whole space is a countable dense subset of itself. An important example of an uncountable separable space is the real line, in which the rational numbers form a countable dense subset. Similarly the set of all length- vectors of rational numbers, is a countable dense subset of the set of all length- vectors of real numbers, ; so for every , -dimensional Euclidean space is separable.

A simple example of a space that is not separable is a discrete space of uncountable cardinality.

Further examples are given below.

Separability versus second countability
Any second-countable space is separable: if  is a countable base, choosing any  from the non-empty  gives a countable dense subset. Conversely, a metrizable space is separable if and only if it is second countable, which is the case if and only if it is Lindelöf.

To further compare these two properties:
 An arbitrary subspace of a second-countable space is second countable; subspaces of separable spaces need not be separable (see below).
 Any continuous image of a separable space is separable ; even a quotient of a second-countable space need not be second countable.
 A product of at most continuum many separable spaces is separable . A countable product of second-countable spaces is second countable, but an uncountable product of second-countable spaces need not even be first countable.

We can construct an example of a separable topological space that is not second countable. Therefore, the space is separable but there cannot be a countable base.

Cardinality
The property of separability does not in and of itself give any limitations on the cardinality of a topological space: any set endowed with the trivial topology is separable, as well as second countable, quasi-compact, and connected. The "trouble" with the trivial topology is its poor separation properties: its Kolmogorov quotient is the one-point space.

A first-countable, separable Hausdorff space (in particular, a separable metric space) has at most the continuum cardinality .

A separable Hausdorff space has cardinality at most , where  is the cardinality of the continuum. The cardinality of the set  of such filter bases is at most . Moreover, in a Hausdorff space, there is at most one limit to every filter base. Therefore, there is a surjection  when 

The same arguments establish a more general result: suppose that a Hausdorff topological space  contains a dense subset of cardinality .
Then  has cardinality at most  and cardinality at most  if it is first countable.

The product of at most continuum many separable spaces is a separable space . In particular the space  of all functions from the real line to itself, endowed with the product topology, is a separable Hausdorff space of cardinality . More generally, if  is any infinite cardinal, then a product of at most  spaces with dense subsets of size at most  has itself a dense subset of size at most  (Hewitt–Marczewski–Pondiczery theorem).

Constructive mathematics
Separability is especially important in numerical analysis and constructive mathematics, since many theorems that can be proved for nonseparable spaces have constructive proofs only for separable spaces. Such constructive proofs can be turned into algorithms for use in numerical analysis, and they are the only sorts of proofs acceptable in constructive analysis. A famous example of a theorem of this sort is the Hahn–Banach theorem.

Further examples

Separable spaces
 Every compact metric space (or metrizable space) is separable.
 Any topological space that is the union of a countable number of separable subspaces is separable. Together, these first two examples give a different proof that -dimensional Euclidean space is separable.
 The space  of all continuous functions from a compact subset  to the real line  is separable.
 The Lebesgue spaces , over a separable measure space , are separable for any .
 A Hilbert space is separable if and only if it has a countable orthonormal basis.  It follows that any separable, infinite-dimensional Hilbert space is isometric to the space  of square-summable sequences.
 An example of a separable space that is not second-countable is the Sorgenfrey line , the set of real numbers equipped with the lower limit topology.

Non-separable spaces
 The first uncountable ordinal , equipped with its natural order topology, is not separable.
 The Banach space  of all bounded real sequences, with the supremum norm, is not separable.
 The Banach space of functions of bounded variation is not separable; note however that this space has very important applications in mathematics, physics and engineering.

Properties
 A subspace of a separable space need not be separable (see the Sorgenfrey plane and the Moore plane), but every open subspace of a separable space is separable . Also every subspace of a separable metric space is separable.
 In fact, every topological space is a subspace of a separable space of the same cardinality.
This follows since such functions are determined by their values on dense subsets.
 From the above property, one can deduce the following: If X is a separable space having an uncountable closed discrete subspace, then X cannot be normal. This shows that the Sorgenfrey plane is not normal.
For a compact Hausdorff space X, the following are equivalent:

Embedding separable metric spaces
 Every separable metric space is homeomorphic to a subset of the Hilbert cube. This is established in the proof of the Urysohn metrization theorem.
 Every separable metric space is isometric to a subset of the (non-separable) Banach space l∞ of all bounded real sequences with the supremum norm; this is known as the Fréchet embedding. 
 Every separable metric space is isometric to a subset of C([0,1]), the separable Banach space of continuous functions [0,1] → R, with the supremum norm. This is due to Stefan Banach. 
 Every separable metric space is isometric to a subset of the Urysohn universal space.
For nonseparable spaces:

References

General topology
Properties of topological spaces